Vladimir Iosifovich Veksler (March 4, 1907 – September 22, 1966) was a prominent Soviet experimental physicist.

Biography 
Veksler was born in Zhitomir on March 4, 1907 in the Russian Empire to a Jewish family. Veksler's family moved from Zhitomir to Moscow in 1915. In 1931 he graduated from the Moscow Power Engineering Institute. He began working at the Lebedev Physical Institute in 1936, and became involved in particle detector development and the study of cosmic rays. He participated in a number of expeditions to the Pamir Mountains and to Mount Elbrus, which were devoted to the study of cosmic ray composition. In 1944, he began working in the field of accelerator physics, where he became famous for the invention of the microtron, and the development of the synchrotron in independence to Edwin McMillan, pursuing the development of modern particle accelerators.

In 1956 he established and became the first director of the Laboratory of High Energy at the Joint Institute for Nuclear Research in Dubna, where the Synchrophasotron, that, along with Protvino, incorporated the largest circular proton accelerators in the world at their time, was constructed under his leadership.

From 1946 to 1957, he was a corresponding member of the Academy of Sciences of the Soviet Union. Veksler became a full member of the Academy in 1958. In 1963 he was appointed head of the Nuclear Physics Department of the Academy.  In 1965, Veksler established the journal Nuclear Physics (Yadernaya Fizika) and became its first editor-in-chief.

The Russian Academy of Sciences established in 1994 the V. I. Veksler Prize for outstanding achievement in accelerator physics (and in 1991 awarded the V. I. Veksler Gold Medal to Alexander N. Skrinsky). Streets in Dubna, Odessa, Zhytomyr and CERN are named in Veksler's honour.

Awards 
He received numerous honours, including the Stalin Prize in 1951, the American Atoms for Peace Award in 1963 and the Lenin Prize in 1959.

See also 
 Synchrophasotron
 U-70 (synchrotron)

References

External links 
  (See Nobel Prize#Nominations.)

1907 births
1966 deaths
20th-century Ukrainian physicists
Scientists  from Zhytomyr
People from Volhynian Governorate
Communist Party of the Soviet Union members
Full Members of the USSR Academy of Sciences
Moscow Power Engineering Institute alumni
Atoms for Peace Award recipients
Stalin Prize winners
Lenin Prize winners
Recipients of the Order of Lenin
Recipients of the Order of the Red Banner of Labour
Soviet nuclear physicists
Soviet inventors
Accelerator physicists
Jewish Ukrainian scientists
Ukrainian inventors

Burials at Novodevichy Cemetery